Hippolyte, or Hippolyta, was a queen of the Amazons in Greek mythology.

Hippolyte, Hippolyta or variant spellings, may also refer to:

 Hippolyte (name), including a list of people and fictional characters with the name, or variant spellings of the name
 Hippolyte (mythology), a list of other mythological characters
 10295 Hippolyta, a minor planet
 Hippolyte (crustacean), a genus of shrimp
 "Hippolyte", a song by Andreas Vollenweider from the 1989 album Dancing with the Lion

See also
 
 
 
 Hippolytus (disambiguation)
 Hyppolite (disambiguation)
 Saint-Hippolyte (disambiguation)
 Catocala semirelicta hippolyta, a moth subspecies
 Hippolyte Rocks, an island off Tasmania, Australia